Rodovia Dom Pedro I (official designation SP-065) is a highway in the state of São Paulo, Brazil.

One of the most modern and scenic highways in the country, it interconnects the Anhangüera and the Presidente Dutra highways, serving the major cities of Campinas, Atibaia, Jacareí and São José dos Campos. It is 126 km long and crosses a picturesque hilly region full of lakes, dams and temperate forests. The highway intersects the Fernão Dias Highway, between São Paulo and Belo Horizonte, near the city of Atibaia. The part of the highway that runs inside the city of Campinas comprises one leg of the Campinas Beltway (Anel Viário José Magalhães Teixeira).

The highway was named after Emperor Dom Pedro I, partly because it was inaugurated in 1972 and served to commemorate 150 years of Independence. A second roadway was built and the road enhanced to highway standards in 1990.

The highway is managed and maintained by DERSA, a state-owned company, and is a toll road.

Gallery

See also
 Highway system of São Paulo
 Brazilian Highway System

Highways in São Paulo (state)
Transport in Campinas
Toll roads